Dispute Systems Design (DSD) involves the creation of a set of dispute resolution processes to help an organization, institution, nation-state, or other set of individuals better manage a particular conflict and/or a continuous stream or series of conflicts. For an article about systems for dealing with disputes within organizations see also complaint systems.

See also
 Conflict management
 Conflict resolution research

References
Carrie Menkel-Meadow, Roots and Inspirations: A Brief History of the Foundations of Dispute Resolution, The Handbook of Dispute Resolution, Michael L. Moffitt and Robert C. Bordone, eds., 13–31, (PON Books, 2005).

Further reading
 Lisa Blomgren Amsler, Janet K. Martínez, and Stephanie E. Smith, Dispute System Design: Preventing, Managing, and Resolving Conflict.  (Stanford University Press, 2020). 
 William Ury, Jeanne M. Brett, and Stephan B. Goldberg,Getting Disputes Resolved: Design Systems to Cut the Costs of Conflict. (PON Books, 1993).
 Cathy Costantino and Christina Sickles-Merchant,Designing Conflict Management Systems. (Jossey-Bass, 1996).
 Khalil Z. Shariff, Designing Institutions to Manage Conflict: Principles of the Problem Solving Organization, 8 Harv. Negot. L. Rev. 133, 133–57 (2003).

Additional resources
 Harvard Negotiation and Mediation Clinical Program at Harvard Law School
 Dispute Systems Design Symposium March 7-8, 2008 at Harvard Law School
 Conflict Resolution Forum at the University of Colorado
 Journal on Dispute Resolution Symposium 2008 at Ohio State
 Beyondintractability.org
 http://web.mit.edu/ombud/publications/ for many articles about complaint systems.

Dispute resolution